Ibra is the second largest city in the Ash Sharqiyah Region of Oman. It is located about 170 km (2 hours) from Muscat and has a population estimated at 55,000 people.

Ibra is one of the oldest cities in Oman and was once a centre of trade, religion, education and art. The city acquired its importance as an important meeting point at the base of the Ash Sharqiya.

Ibra is home of the Al Harthy, Al Maskari, Al Mughairi and Al Riyami tribes, some of the biggest tribes in Oman, and all of which are very prevalent in Ibra. Sheikh Saif bin Hashil Al-Maskari is one of the most prominent Sheikhs of Ibra. Sheikh Saif bin Hashil Al-Maskari is among the biggest businessmen in Oman, he has invested heavily in improving Ibra and its infrastructure. Sheikh Saif was also a former GCC Assistant Secretary-General for Political Affairs and Ibra is his tribal home town.

Etymology
Historians do not agree on the origins of the name of the city. Some suggest it is derived from the Arabic verb which means a purification of guilt.

History

Ibra predates the Prophet Muhammed's calling. The city contains many castles and old mosques.

Ibra has become a more modern city since 1970 under the reign of Sultan Qaboos. Improvements include connections to Muscat via a three-lane highway, which has increased tourism.  Communications have been improved to include broadband access, and there is now a substantial hospital. Ibra provides three choices of higher education: Ibra College of Technology, Ibra Nursing Institute, and beginning in the fall of 2010, A’Sharqiyah University. There are now two hotels in Ibra, and tourism is promoted in the area.

Geography and climate
Ibra has a hot desert climate (Köppen climate classification: BWh). Mountains surround Ibra on every side, and there is some outstanding mountain scenery close by. In the summer, the climate is hot and dry, with temperatures reaching  in July. Precipitation is very low and occurs mostly in the winter, when masses of low pressure air cause rain to fall.

Ibra College of Technology

Ibra College of Technology (ICT) is one of the seven Colleges of Technology under the Ministry of Manpower (MoMP). The college is fully funded by the government to cater to the higher educational needs of Omani nationals as full-time students. It has been established to provide technological education for post secondary students leading to Certificate, Diploma and Higher Diploma in the fields of Business, Information Technology, and Engineering. To date, ICT plays a leading role in the educational, cultural and social development of the region.

Attractions

The main tourist attractions in the city are its many beautiful watchtowers, the traditional Souq, and Falaj AlAfrit. The design of the souq complements the fort in every way. 
The Bait al Kabir was built in 1650 during the Ya'riba Dynasty. It once stood as a centre of Government in Ibra.

Ibra Souq

The city, famous for its handicrafts and agricultural products, has an expansive souq showcasing an array of products. It is one of the most important in the country besides Muttrah. The souq bustles with vendors selling everything from meat, fish, fruits and vegetables to spices, dates, gold and silverware. Ibra is renowned for its silver jewelry which is considered to be the best in the country. Halwa (a traditional Omani dessert) is also sold in the souq. Halwa is a sticky dessert made from sugar and spices and flavoured with sesame seeds or almonds.
Ibra souq is the only souq in the country to have a whole day just for women.

See also 

 List of cities in Oman

References 

Populated places in Oman